CSF Bălți is a Moldovan professional football club based in Bălți, founded in 1984 as FC Zaria Bălți and refounded in 2020 as CSF Bălți.
They play in the Moldovan Super Liga, the top division of Moldovan football. Between 1992 and 2014, the team was known as FC Olimpia Bălți.

History

The club was founded in 1984 as FC Zaria Bălți, and in 1992, when Moldova gained its independence, the club was renamed to FC Olimpia Bălți. In July 2014 it was decided to return to the old name - FC Zaria Bălți.

CSF Bălți gained worldwide notoriety in December 2009 for putting an online bid through which the winner would awarded a one-year contract as a player with the club. The winner was a Brazilian businessman who had a brief career as a footballer in his native country. Nevertheless, the winning bidder declined the position stating that, since he never paid the application fee, he assumed his bid would not be taken into account. In April 2010 the club called for a new bidding round. The winner was never announced, though.

Name history
FC Zaria Bălți (1984–1991)
FC Olimpia Bălți (1991–2014)
FC Zaria Bălți (2014–2019)
CSF Bălți (2020–)

Honours 
•  Moldovan Cup

Winners (1): 2015–16

Runners-up (2): 2010–11, 2016–17 
• Moldovan Super Cup
Runners-up (1): 2016 Divizia A:
Winners (1): 2020–21

Current squad

European record
UEFA Europa League

Notes
 Q1: First qualifying round
 Q2: Second qualifying round

List of seasons

References

External links
 Official website 
 FC Bălți on divizia-a.md 
 FC Bălți on Soccerway

 
Football clubs in Moldova
Association football clubs established in 1984
FC Balti
FC Balti
Football clubs in the Moldavian Soviet Socialist Republic